Beacon Hill is a hill in the county of Radnorshire, Wales. It lies within the Powys unitary council area. It is located north-west of the town of Knighton close to the valley of the River Teme.

External links 
Volume 19: British Silurian Stratigraphy — Chapter 05, Figure 5.64

Mountains and hills of Powys
Marilyns of Wales